Cala is a town in Sakhisizwe Local Municipality, part of the Chris Hani District Municipality in the Eastern Cape province of South Africa.

The village is located on the Tsomo River, 28 km southwest of Elliot. The name is Xhosa for ‘adjacent to’, referring to its situation west of the Drakensberg, which here extends north and south.

References

Populated places in the Sakhisizwe Local Municipality